Deh-e Ebrahim (also Romanized as Deh-e Ebrāhīm) is a village in Dehdasht-e Sharqi Rural District, in the Central District of Kohgiluyeh County, Kohgiluyeh and Boyer-Ahmad Province, Iran. At the 2006 census, its population was 118, in 21 families.

References 

Populated places in Kohgiluyeh County